Edward Martin (15 May 1910 – January 1990) was an English professional footballer who made 155 Football League appearances playing as a left back for Brighton & Hove Albion.

Life and career
Martin was born in Greasley, Nottinghamshire. He played for Selston Amateurs and Heanor Town and had an unsuccessful trial with West Bromwich Albion before signing for Brighton & Hove Albion of the Football League Third Division South in September 1932. He was a first-team regular in the last four seasons before the Football League was suspended for the duration of the Second World War, and helped Albion finish as runners-up in 1938–39. Martin served in the Army, and made guest appearances for Portsmouth and Bournemouth before resuming his Albion career in the 1945–46 FA Cup. He played no more league football through injury, and went on to work as an electrician in a Nottinghamshire colliery.

Martin died in Selston, Nottinghamshire, in 1990 at the age of 79.

References

1910 births
1990 deaths
People from the Borough of Broxtowe
Footballers from Nottinghamshire
English footballers
Association football fullbacks
Heanor Town F.C. players
Brighton & Hove Albion F.C. players
English Football League players
British Army personnel of World War II